Rose Neill (born 1958) is a Northern Ireland news broadcaster, currently working for UTV. At the beginning of her career she was the youngest newsreader in the United Kingdom, and she is the longest-serving newscasters in the British Isles, having worked for 46 consecutive years newscasting .

Early life
She received her formal education at The Mount School, York, and went on to study Dispensing Optics at the City and East London College.

Broadcasting career
Neill's broadcasting career began in 1977. Her early career included presenting children's educational programmes and newscasting for Ulster Television. She also worked as a continuity announcer and co-presented Sportscast with Jackie Fullerton.

She moved to BBC Northern Ireland in 1984 to co-present the flagship news programme Inside Ulster alongside Sean Rafferty, and went on to present its replacement BBC Newsline. She also presented a daily three-hour show on BBC Radio Ulster. From 2002 to 2008, Neill was involved in writing and presenting a series of medical documentaries. She also contributed to various BBC Northern Ireland programmes including Children in Need coverage. She left BBC Northern Ireland in August 2008.

In 2009, Neill presented a documentary on the RMS Titanic for UTV, and latterly returned to the station as a freelance newsreader and in-vision continuity announcer. In May 2014, she was appointed as main anchor for UTV Live, alongside Paul Clark.

Neill co-presents the main evening news at 6 and is also a luxury travel writer, who has travelled extensively all her life, and more recently to Asia, India, The Caribbean, North and South America.

Personal life
Neill is an honorary vice-patron of Cancer Focus Northern Ireland, and Chairperson of the Riding for the Disabled Association. She is married and has two children and is involved with the Northern Ireland Mother & Baby Appeal. Her hobbies include riding, hunting, Snow & Water-skiing.

References

External links
 Rose Neill's profile on BBCi

Living people
Television presenters from Northern Ireland
Television personalities from Belfast
Radio and television announcers
UTV (TV channel)
People educated at The Mount School, York
1958 births